Amyxa is a genus of flowering plants belonging to the family Thymelaeaceae.

Its native range is Borneo.

Species:

Amyxa pluricornis

References

Thymelaeaceae
Malvales genera